Bierwirth is a German surname. Notable people with the surname include:

John Bierwirth ( 1924–2013), American lawyer and businessman
Karl Bierwirth (1907–1955), German weightlifter
Petra Bierwirth (born 1960), German politician
Rudolph Bierwirth (1899–1993), Australian army officer

German-language surnames